Calliostoma nordenskjoldi is a species of sea snail, a marine gastropod mollusk in the family Calliostomatidae.

Description
The size of the shell varies between 6 mm and 14 mm.

Distribution
This marine species occurs in the Atlantic Ocean off Brazil to Patagonia at depths between 60 m and 100 m.

References

 Strebel, H. 1908. Die Gastropoden (mit Ausnahme de nackten Opisthobranchier). Wissenschaftliche Ergebnisse der Schwedischen Südpolar-Expedition 1901-1903 6(1): 111 pp., 6 pls.

External links
 To Biodiversity Heritage Library (1 publication)
 To Encyclopedia of Life
 To World Register of Marine Species
 

nordenskjoldi
Gastropods described in 1908